Albert Bokhare Saunders (1880–1946) was a successful and prolific composer of romantic and light classical music. He worked as an arranger for Sydney music publisher W.H. Palings. He worked under various pseudonyms including Albert Earl and Albert Trelba but is most widely known as Clement Scott.

Saunders was born in Brewarrina, rural New South Wales. He has been credited as composer of "Swiss Cradle Song", possibly collected from the Māori folk song "Po Ata Rau" and given English language lyrics as "Now is the Hour", sung by departing troops in The Great War and recalled by patriotic New Zealanders. During his life, he successfully sued a Sydney entertainment producer for breach of copyright, but his widow was unsuccessful making the same claim on Palings for the famous cradle song. The song was an international hit.

On at least one occasion, Saunders acted as bandmaster for a group playing brass. 

Several solo piano editions of Saunder's popular "Comet March" are preserved in Australian libraries. The original 1910 edition for trio of piano, cornet and violin seems to have been lost, yet the piece was still being orchestrated by amateurs twenty years later.

Works

Orchestrated Works
Saunders composed about three hundred pieces during his lifetime, of which over two hundred are preserved in Australian libraries. His later works show a capacity for originality and counterpoint. These pieces of ensemble music are orchestrated for trio of violin, cornet and piano and sometimes for quartette including double bass.

 1913 Swiss Cradle Song 
 1919 Cuddles
 1919 Wirra Warra Schottische
 Devotion Waltz
 Alpine Violets
 Loves Melody 
 1920 Love's Melody
 Swiss Scenes 
 Australian Cradle Song (trio for piano, cornet, violin)

Others Works

 Serbian Cradle Song
 Irish Cradle Song
 Prince of Diggers
 "Go ahead!" march for piano
 Love's melody : a romance for the piano
 Devotion waltz
 1919 Cuddles
 1910 Wandering thoughts : tone poem for piano
 1910 Wirra warra schottische
 St. Michaels : fox-trot
 Happy Moments : eight easy pieces for little fingers
 Comet March
 Waratah : pianoforte solo
 Boronia
 Flannel Flowers
 Poppies Gavotte: easy piano solo without octaves
 Joyful Nights Waltz
 Kitchener March
 Scarf Dance
 Wattle Blossoms
 (disputed) 1913 Swiss Cradle Song
 (attributed) Tiny Tunes For Wee Australians

References

1880 births
1946 deaths
20th-century Australian musicians
20th-century classical composers
Australian male classical composers
People from New South Wales
Australian songwriters
20th-century Australian male musicians